Ulukent, Arhavi, a Turkish village in the Arhavi district of the Artvin Province
Ulukent, Diyadin, a Turkish village in the Diyadin district of the Ağrı Province
Ulukent, Kyrgyzstan, a Kyrgyzstani village in the Jalal-Abad Province 
Ulukent, Menemen, a Turkish village in the Menemen district of the İzmir Province
Ulukent (İZBAN), a train station in the previous village
Ulukent, Tavas, a Turkish village in the Tavas district of the Denizli Province
Ulukent mine, a manganese mine near the previous village